In Tamil and Malayalam languages, Thaali is the name for a mangala sutra, a necklace that a groom ties around the bride's neck in a ceremony called Mangalya Dharanam.

Thaali may also refer to:

 Thaali (1993 film), Malayalam film directed by Sajan
 Thaali (1997 film), Tamil film directed by E. V. V. Satyanarayana

See also 
 Thali (disambiguation)